Events in the year 1890 in Bulgaria.

Incumbents

Events 

 7 September – Parliamentary elections were held in the country. The result was an overwhelming victory for the People's Liberal Party of Prime Minister Stefan Stambolov.

References 

 
1890s in Bulgaria
Years of the 20th century in Bulgaria
Bulgaria
Bulgaria